Oginohana Masaaki ( born Masaaki Motomura, 29 November 1935 – 16 December 2006) was a sumo wrestler from Ogi, Saga, Japan. He made his professional debut in 1952 and reached the top makuuchi division in 1957. His highest rank was sekiwake. He retired in 1967 and worked as a coach at Dewanoumi stable before leaving the Sumo Association in 2000 upon reaching the mandatory retirement age of 65. He was the father of Oginohana Akikazu and Oginishiki Yasutoshi, both successful sumo wrestlers themselves.

See also
Glossary of sumo terms
List of past sumo wrestlers
List of sekiwake

References

1935 births
2006 deaths
Japanese sumo wrestlers
Sekiwake